Soleiman Mirza Eskandari (1875 – 7 January 1944) was an Iranian Qajar prince and socialist politician. A civil servant and constitutionalist activist, he served as a member of parliament for four consecutive terms and briefly served as the education minister (maʿāref). During his career, Eskandari was associated with Democrat, Socialist and Tudeh parties. In the aftermath of the Anglo-Soviet invasion of Iran during World War II, the Soviet Union was occupying an area in the north of the country that included the capital of Tehran and took advantage of this position by fostering the creation of the communist Tudeh party under the leadership of Eskandari.

References 

1875 births
1944 deaths
Democrat Party (Persia) politicians
Socialist Party (Iran) politicians
Heads of Tudeh Party of Iran
Members of the 2nd Iranian Majlis
Members of the 3rd Iranian Majlis
Members of the 4th Iranian Majlis
Members of the 5th Iranian Majlis
Deputies of Tehran for National Consultative Assembly
Education ministers
Qajar princes